Holnicote Bay is a bay in Oro Province, south-eastern Papua New Guinea.

Bays of Papua New Guinea